USS Pollack has been the name of more than one United States Navy ship, and may refer to:

 , a submarine in commission from 1937 to 1945
 , a submarine in commission from 1964 to 1989

United States Navy ship names